Viers is an unincorporated community in Dickenson County, Virginia, in the United States.

History
A post office was established at Viers in 1906, and remained in operation until it was discontinued in 1959. The community was named for Lewis Viers, an early settler.

References

Unincorporated communities in Dickenson County, Virginia
Unincorporated communities in Virginia